Bashing may refer:
Bashing (pejorative), physical or verbal assault
Bashing (film), a 2005 film by Kobayashi Masahiro
Railfan jargon term for travelling behind certain locomotives 
An act of recreational radio-controlled car driving